Reuben Povey (born 2 July 1889, date of death unknown) was a South African sprinter. He competed in the men's 100 metres at the 1912 Summer Olympics.

References

External links
 

1889 births
Year of death missing
Athletes (track and field) at the 1912 Summer Olympics
South African male sprinters
Olympic athletes of South Africa
Cape Colony people
People from Uitenhage
Sportspeople from the Eastern Cape